Protecteur was a  74-gun ship of the line of the French Navy, the only to have borne the name.

Career 
She was laid down in 1757 and launched in 1760.

In 1762, under Captain de L'Ilsle Calian, Protecteur was part of Bompart's squadron. In 1766, she escorted merchantmen under Captain de Broves.

In 1788, Under Captain Dapchon, Protecteur was appointed to Admiral d'Estaing's squadron and took part in the American Revolutionary War. She took part in the Battle of Grenada under Grasse-Limermont.

The English  and  intercepted, yielding the Third Battle of Ushant in which they captured Pégase and four transports, but where the rest of the French convoy escaped.

From 1784, Protecteur was hulked and used as a hospital in Rochefort.

Legacy 
A model of a 64-ship of the line on display at the Musée de la Marine is labelled as representing Protecteur, probably as the result of an error of Admiral Pâris.

Sources and references 
 Notes

Citations

References
 
 

External links
  Le Protecteur
  Le Protecteur 
  Le Protecteur 

Ships of the line of the French Navy
1760 ships